The Mizoram football team is an Indian football team representing Mizoram in Indian state football competitions. They were the champions of the Santosh Trophy in the 2013–14 season.

In the finals of 2013–14 Santosh Trophy, played on 9 March at Kanchenjunga Stadium, Siliguri, debutant Mizoram beat the Railways 3–0 to win the trophy, and the Rs 5 lakh prize money, while the runners up Railways received Rs 3 lakh.

Squad
The following 22 players were called for the 2022–23 Santosh Trophy.

Honours

State
 Santosh Trophy
 Winners (1): 2013–14
National Games
 Gold medal (1): 2015
 B.C. Roy Trophy
 Winners (2): 2018–19, 2019–20
 Runners-up (3): 1995–96, 2015–16, 2016–17
 Mir Iqbal Hussain Trophy
 Winners (5): 2004–05, 2005–06, 2006–07, 2009–10, 2016–17
 Runners-up (4): 1965–66, 1997–98, 2007–08, 2010–11
 M. Dutta Ray Trophy
 Runners-up (1): 2008

Others
 Bordoloi Trophy
 Runners-up (1): 1994, 1997

References

External links
 Mizoram football association 
 Mizoram Football Association official page

Santosh Trophy teams
Football in Mizoram